Aleksander Józef Skrzyński (19 March 1882 – 25 September 1931) was a Polish politician, from Zagórzany, Gorlice, Galicia, who served as the 13th Prime Minister of Poland from 1925 to 1926.

He was the first Polish Ambassador to Romania (accredited in 1919), and played a significant part in the negotiations that led to the Polish–Romanian alliance. Later, he served as Minister of Foreign Affairs of the Republic of Poland for two terms, from 1922 to 1923, and from 1924 to 1926.

Shortly after leaving office of prime minister, he engaged in a duel with Stanisław Szeptycki, in which Skrzynski refused to fire. He was killed in a car accident at Łąkociny, Poland.

References

Further reading
   Piotr Stefan Wandycz. Aleksander Skrzyński : minister spraw zagranicznych II Rzeczypospolitej. Warszawa: Polski Instytut Spraw Międzynarodowych, 2006. 

1882 births
1931 deaths
People from Gorlice County
People from the Kingdom of Galicia and Lodomeria
Prime Ministers of Poland
Ministers of Foreign Affairs of the Second Polish Republic
Ambassadors of Poland to Romania
Grand Crosses of the Order of the White Lion